Corentin Moutet was the defending champion but chose not to defend his title.

Pablo Cuevas won the title after defeating Elias Ymer 6–2, 6–2 in the final.

Seeds

Draw

Finals

Top half

Bottom half

References

External links
Main draw
Qualifying draw

Open Sopra Steria de Lyon - 1
2021 Singles